This is a list of wind farms in South Australia. As of 2022, South Australia has 16 operating wind farms with a total installed capacity of about 2,139 MW. Prior to 2003, a 150 kW unit at Coober Pedy was the only large wind turbine in South Australia.

Table

See also 

 List of power stations in South Australia
 Wind power in South Australia

References

External links

 Wind power and wind farms in South Australia: Wind in the Bush
 Photographs of Canunda/Lake Bonney wind farms: Wind in the Bush

South Australia
Wind Farms